Tiina Susanna Elo (born 21 January 1971 in Helsinki) is a Finnish politician currently serving in the Parliament of Finland for the Green League at the Uusimaa constituency.

References

1971 births
Living people
Politicians from Helsinki
Green League politicians
Members of the Parliament of Finland (2019–23)
Women members of the Parliament of Finland
21st-century Finnish women politicians